Livezi may refer to:

Romania
 Livezi, Bacău, a commune in Bacău County
 Livezi, Vâlcea, a commune in Vâlcea County
 Livezi, a village in Podari Commune, Dolj County
 Livezi, a village in Mihăileni Commune, Harghita County
 Livezi, a village in General Berthelot Commune, Hunedoara County
 Livezi, a village in Florești Commune, Mehedinți County
 Livezi, a former commune, merged into Vizantea-Livezi Commune, Vrancea County

Moldova
Livezi, a village in Cremenciug Commune, Soroca district